Tamashek or Tamasheq is a variety of Tuareg, a Berber macro-language widely spoken by nomadic tribes across North Africa in Algeria, Mali, Niger, and Burkina Faso. Tamasheq is one of the three main varieties of Tuareg, the others being Tamajaq and Tamahaq.  

Tamashek is spoken mostly in Mali, especially in its central region including Timbuktu, Kidal, and Gao. It is also spoken by a smaller population in Burkina Faso. As of 2014, approximately 500,000 people speak Tamashek, 378,000 of whom are Malian. The livelihood of the Tuareg people has been under threat in the last century, due to climate change and a series of political conflicts, notably the Arab-Tuareg rebellion of 1990–1995 in Mali which resulted in ethnic cleansing of the Tuareg in the form of reprisal killings and exile. Tamashek is currently classified as a developing language (5), partly due to the Malian government's active promotion of the language; it is currently taught in public education, from primary schools to adult literacy classes. 

Tamashek is often understood in Mali as a term that denotes all Tuareg varieties. Other alternative names for Tamashek include Tamachen, Tamashekin, and Tomacheck.

Dialect divisions of Malian Tamashek 
There are divergent views regarding Tamashek's dialect divisions. Some report two main dialects, named Timbuktu and Tadhaq.

Others take there to be roughly three main divisions of Malian Tamashek:

 Kal Ansar dialects around Timbuktu (denoted 'T-Ka')
 "mainstream" Tamashek dialects spoken in Kidal, Tessalit, the Gao area, and the non-Kal Ansar groups around Timbuktu
 dialects spoken by certain groups in the Gourma of Gao and Ansongo

Phonology

Vowels 
The Tamasheq language has seven vowels in total: two frontal vowels /i/, /æ/; three central vowels /ə/, /æ/, /a/; and two back vowels /u/ /o/. There are two short vowels, /ə/ and /æ/, and the rest are full vowels. There are no diphthongs. 

While all vowels occur word-initially and word-medially, only full vowels occur word-finally.

Consonants 
Tamasheq has 33 consonants, featuring six manners of articulation and eight places of articulation. There are no non-pulmonic consonants. The consonants are detailed in the table below. 

The table places the two laryngeal consonants, and /h/ and /ʔ/, according to the IPA chart (the source did not specify their manners of articulation).

Consonants in a single parenthesis are of marginal use, "confined largely to loanwords." Consonants of Arabic origins --  /sˤ/, /ɫ/, /ħ/, /ʕ/, and /ʔ/ -- occur in Arabic loanwords. The glottal stop /ʔ/ is already largely absent in local Arabic dialects, is thus only found in unassimilated Islamic vocabulary. 

Consonants in a double parenthesis occur mostly as geminated versions of other consonants. A uvular stop /q/ principally occurs in the geminated form /qq/, which can be interpreted as the "phonetic realization of geminated /ɣɣ/.

Accent 
Accent is an "important feature of Tamasheq". The role of accent is "very different" for verbs and nouns. For nouns and other non-verb stems, accent is lexically determined. This is not the case for verbs. According to the rule called "default accentuation," the accent falls on the antepenult or on the leftmost syllable of verbs. The exception to the rule is resultative and long imperfect positive stems. 

For example, a-bæ̀mbæra, which means Bambara, has its primary accent on the antepenult syllable. A bisyllabic word hæ̀ræt, which is glossed as 'thing,' has its accent on the initial syllable.

Morphology 
Tamasheq's two main morphological processes are ablaut and affixation, with the former permeating the language. Many processes also undergo a combination of the two.

Derivational morphology 
Most of Tamasheq nouns are underived, although some are derived by "some combination of ablaut and prefixation." For example, the noun t-æ-s-ȁnan-t, which means 'oxpecker,' is prefixally derived from the causative verb æ̀ss-onæn 'tame, break in animal' with its -s- prefix.

In Tamasheq, nearly all "modifying adjectives" are participles of inflected intransitive verbs. For example, the verb 'to ripe' is əŋŋá, and it is inflected into participles such as i-ŋŋá-n (MaSg) or t-əŋŋá-t (FeSg). These resultative participles are used with "adjectival" sense, adjectivalized into the word 'ripened'.

Nominal morphology

Gender and number 
Gender and number are mainly marked using affixation, though in many cases they use ablaut or a combination of both.

Most nouns, regardless of gender, have vocalic prefixes, varying between -æ-/-ə, -a-, or -e- for the singular, and invariable i- in the plural. Some nouns entirely lack a vocalic prefix, e.g. deké ('basket').

Feminine nouns are additionally marked by the Fe[minine] prefix t-. For feminine singular nouns, suffix -t is required to denote singularity, thus we see a circumfix t-...-t. In cases where the stem ends in a vowel, however, an additional inner Fe suffix -t- is added before the outer suffix, thus the affix frame becomes t-...-t-t. 

In addition to the plural vocalic prefix -i-, pluralization of nouns requires gender-based suffixation: for feminine plural nouns, suffix -en or -ten is added, while for masculine nouns Ma[sculine] suffix -æn or -tæn is added. In some cases, a noun pluralizes by stem ablaut without suffixation; one example of unsuffixed plural ablaut is æ̀-ɣata ('crocodile'), which is pluralized to ì-ɣata. 

The table below illustrates the idealized morphological rules of gender and number marking explained so far:

Compounding 
Tamasheq makes use of compounding to form nouns. Most noun-noun compounds necessitate a possessor preposition ə̀n in between the two morphemes, which can be analytically structured as [X [ə̀n Y]] 'X of Y.' Depending on the nouns, ə̀n may become unaccented, as shown in the first example below.

Verbal morphology 
Ablaut distinguishes the three basic inflectable verb stems in Tamasheq:

perfective
short imperfective
 long imperfective

Ablaut can change a perfect present stem to a resultative stem. For example, the perfect present stem of the verb 'to run' is òšæl, and its resultative stem is òšál. Note the vowel change from /æ/ to /á/. Ablaut also creates perfective negative stems; for example, the perfect negative stem of əhlæk, the perfect present stem of 'destroy,' is ə̀hlek. 

Affixation is also a morphological tool for Tamasheq verbs. One category of verbal affixation is pronominal subject affixes. For example, pronominal subject marking in positive imperatives uses suffixation. The table demonstrates second person subject affixes in imperatives with the example of the verb ə̀jjəš ('enter').

Suffixation is responsible for hortative stems. The hortative suffix -et can be added to short imperfective stems. For example:

Particles 
Particles exist in Tamasheq. One type of particle is preposition-like, and these particles precede noun phrases or independent pronouns. For example:

Many categories of discourse-functional particles exist as well. For example, ɣás is an "extremely common" phrase-final particle that means 'only':

 

Another example, though less common, is a clause-final particle yá, which emphasizes on the truth of a statement:

Clitics 
In terms of structure, clitics are "normally realized at the end of the first word" in the clause. There are many types of clitics, including directionals, object and dative pronominals, pronominal prepositional phrases, etc. Below, clitics are indicated by the symbol "-\".

Directional clitics 
There are two directional clitics -- "centripetal" clitics and "centrifugal" clitics -- and they cannot co-occur. The directional clitics are attached to the pronominal clitics hosted by the same word, and are usually accented.

The centripetal clitic's rudimentary form is -\ə̀dd. Its allomorphic variation depends on postvocalic versus postconsonantal position (e.g. -\ə̀d if , -\dd after a, and -\hə̀dd after high V). This clitic can be best understood as 'here,' as it specifies a direction toward "the deictic center." If the verb is non-motion, then the clitic suggests that the action was directed toward 'here' or was carried out in 'this direction'. 

On the other hand, the centrifugal clitic (-\ín) indicates direction away from the deictic center, and is best translated to 'away' or 'there' in English.

Pronominal clitics

Object clitics 
Pronominal object clitics are attached at the end of a simple transitive verb, or a preverbal particle if relevant. Pronominal clitics show wide allomorphic variation mainly depending on point of view and plurality. Allomorphs differ both syntactically and phonologically. The table below shows first person object clitics found in Kal Ansar dialects (T-ka). 

As seen in the table, the T-ka first-person singular object clitic attached to a preverbal particle is -\hi. The phrase 'he makes me weep' translates to i-s-álha-\hi, with the clitic attached at the end of the verb 'to make weep' (álha).

The table below shows second and third person object clitics for T-ka dialects. The column designated for post-a variants also occasionally applies for post-i variants.

Dative clitics 
Tamasheq also makes use of pronominal dative clitics. The basic dative morpheme is -\ha-, and it gets reduced to -\a\ or -\hə in certain contexts. 1Sg and 1Pl object and dative clitics are identical.

This example shows the first-person dative clitic -\a-hi, which follows the verb 'hit' (wæt).

Ordering of clitics 
The basic ordering of clitics is as follows: 

 host word
 cliticized preposition
 objective and/or dative
 directional 
 pronominal prepositional phrase

For example:

Syntax

Word order 
Tamashek's simple main clauses have the word order of VSO: [verb(-\clitics)  (subject)  (object)...].

Verb phrases 
As shown in the examples above, the verb precedes the object.  

Auxiliaries precede the verb phrase. Future particle has a form àd in clause-initial position. For example:  

 

The clause-internal negative particle is wæ̀r, though it is heard as [wər] if it is directly before {ə u i}. For example:

Noun phrases 
In Tamashek, a NP starts with the head noun, followed by an adnominal complement such as a demonstrative, a possessor, or a relative clause. Tamashek does not have definiteness marking.

A few chief examples of NP are given below:

Demonstrative NP

Relative clause NP

Possessor NP

Numeral NP 
Unlike the above three types where the NP starts with the head noun, numerals normally precede the head noun. One exception is when the numeral 'one' functions as an indefinite determiner, rather than as an actual number.

Adpositional phrases 
Tamashek has prepositions.

Interrogatives 
In Tamashek, question particles precede the clause.

Topicalization 
Topicalization is present in Tamashek, and a topicalized constituent may appear "before the clause proper." For example:

Focalization 
Focalization is present in Tamashek. The focalized constituted is "fronted to sentence-initial position." The morpheme à, best understood as a minimal demonstrative form, usually follows the focus. For example:

References

Further reading 
 Sudlow, David. The Tamasheq of North-East Burkina Faso: notes on grammar and syntax including a key vocabulary. Vol. 1. R. Köppe Verlag, 2001.

External link
Daily phrases in Tamasheq

POS:positive
CENTRIPETAL:centripetal
SH:short
LO:Long

Berbers in Burkina Faso
Berbers in Mali
Languages of Burkina Faso
Languages of Mali
Tuareg languages

br:Tamajekeg
hr:Tayart Tamajeq (jezik)
sh:Tayart Tamajeq (jezik)